David George Trist (born 22 September 1947 in Christchurch) is a former first-class cricketer who played for Canterbury. A right arm fast-medium bowler, he played 24 first-class games between 1968–69 and 1977–78.

After retiring he became a cricket coach and led Eastern Province to victory in the 1989 Currie Cup. He also had spells as coach of Hong Kong (at the 1997 ICC Trophy) and the Netherlands. Following New Zealand's tour of England in 1999, Trist replaced Steve Rixon as coach of his home country. Under Trist, New Zealand won the 2000 ICC KnockOut Trophy in Nairobi, New Zealand's first world title.

References

External links
 David Trist at Cricinfo
 David Trist at Cricket Archive

1947 births
Living people
New Zealand cricketers
Canterbury cricketers
New Zealand cricket coaches
Coaches of the New Zealand national cricket team
Coaches of the Hong Kong national cricket team
Coaches of the Netherlands national cricket team
New Zealand expatriate sportspeople in the Netherlands
New Zealand expatriates in Hong Kong
New Zealand expatriates in South Africa
South Island cricketers